Fletcher Summerfield Stockdale (c. 1823 – 4 February 1890) was an American politician, lawyer, and railroad official who served as Acting Governor of Texas and Lieutenant Governor of Texas.

Early life
Stockdale was born in either 1823 or 1825 in Russellville, Kentucky as one of eight children of Thomas W. and Laurinda Stockdale.

Political career
He studied law and was admitted to the Bar in Kentucky. Stockdale moved to Texas in 1846 and settled in Grimes County.

By 1856, Stockdale had moved to Calhoun County, which he represented in the Texas Senate from 1857 to 1861. Stockdale was an executive member of the 1861 Secession Convention that was held in Austin. During 1862 and 1863 he held the position of aide to Governor Francis R. Lubbock.

Political executive
He was elected Lieutenant Governor in 1863, and served in that post until late May 1865 when he became the acting Governor of Texas after then-Governor Pendleton Murrah fled to Mexico. Stockdale filled the vacant post of Governor for three months until provisional governor Andrew J. Hamilton assumed office in August 1865.

Stockdale had served Texas during very troubling times. Lawlessness, Indian attacks, and severe deterioration of the government during the American Civil War had plagued his 18-month tenure as a political executive in Texas.

Stockdale was again a member of the Texas State Senate in 1868. In 1875, during the Texas Constitutional Convention, he served on the committees of judiciary & land grants and participated in various debates to establish a free public school system in Texas. He served as a delegate to the national Democratic conventions of 1872, 1876, and 1880.

Stockdale was selected as one of the Texas Democratic convention's vice presidents of 1873. In 1876, 1882 and 1888, Stockdale was a member of the committee on resolutions and platforms at the Texas Democratic convention, where he chaired the committee in 1876.

Railroad official
In the late 1860s, Stockdale served as president of the Indianola Railroad and promoted the development of refrigerated cars for carrying beef to markets.

Later life and family
Stockdale's first wife, Elizabeth Pryor Bankhead Lytle, died on April 17, 1865.

Stockdale married his second wife, Elizabeth Schleicher, the daughter of Texas politician Gustav Schleicher, on July 11, 1877 in Washington, D.C. They had three children. They resided in Cuero, Texas, until his death on February 4, 1890.

Legacy
Stockdale, Texas, in Wilson County was named in his honor.

References

External links
 

1823 births
1890 deaths
19th-century American politicians
19th-century American railroad executives
Democratic Party governors of Texas
Lieutenant Governors of Texas
People from Grimes County, Texas
People from Calhoun County, Texas
People from Cuero, Texas
Democratic Party Texas state senators
People from Victoria, Texas
People from Russellville, Kentucky